Dracula - Swing of Death is a rock opera concept album released by Norwegian musicians, singer Jørn Lande and guitarist Trond Holter. It is based in the storyline of Bram Stoker's Dracula. 

The whole album was performed live on 1 May 2015 at the Karmoygeddon Festival in Norway, with all musicians who played on the record.

Track listing

Personnel
Jørn Lande - lead & backing vocals
Trond Holter – Guitar, Piano
Bernt Jansen – Bass
Per Morten Bergseth – Drums
Lena Fløitmoen Børresen - lead vocals on "Save Me", "River of Tears”, "Into the Dark" and “Under the Gun", backing vocals on "Swing of Death"

Additional staff 

 Cornelia Tihon - Pan flute
 Catalin Popa - Violin
 Solveig Mikkelsen Solhaug, Tommy Wærnes, Ingeborg Holter & Håkon Holter - Backing Vocals 
 Stan-W Decker	- Artwork, Layout

References

2015 albums
Frontiers Records albums
Rock operas
Music based on novels
Vampires in music
Works based on Dracula